Cuba participated at the 2018 Summer Youth Olympics in Buenos Aires, Argentina from 6 October to 18 October 2018.

Medals

Medals awarded to participants of mixed-NOC (combined) teams are represented in italics. These medals are not counted towards the individual NOC medal tally.

Archery

Cuba qualified one archer based on its performance at the American Continental Qualification Tournament.

Individual

Team

Athletics

Boys
Field events

Girls
Track and road events

Field events

Beach volleyball

Cuba qualified a boys' team based on their performance at the 2018 Central Zone U19 Championship.

 Boys' tournament - 1 team of 2 athletes

Judo

Individual

Team

Rowing

Cuba qualified two boats based on its performance at the American Qualification Regatta.

 Boys' single sculls - 1 athlete
 Girls' single sculls - 1 athlete

Triathlon

Cuba qualified one athlete based on its performance at the 2018 American Youth Olympic Games Qualifier.

Individual

Relay

Wrestling

Key:
  – Victory by Fall
  – Without any points scored by the opponent
  – With point(s) scored by the opponent
  – Without any points scored by the opponent
  – With point(s) scored by the opponent

References

2018 in Cuban sport
Nations at the 2018 Summer Youth Olympics
Cuba at the Youth Olympics